Praia do Xai-Xai is a beach which is a tourist destination in Mozambique.  Located approximately 10 kilometers from Xai-Xai, the seat of Mozambique's Gaza Province, the beach attracts visitors who are interested in exploring the massive coral reef that runs parallel to the shoreline.

References

External links 
“Southern Africa” by Alan Murphy, Kate Armstrong, Matthew D. Firestone, Mary Fitzpatrick

Beaches of Mozambique
Geography of Gaza Province
Tourist attractions in Gaza Province